Danitza Fernanda Vázquez Maccarini (born April 25, 2000 in Caguas, Puerto Rico) is a chess player from Puerto Rico. After winning the Central American and Caribbean U20 Girls Championship in El Salvador in 2013, she was awarded by FIDE the title Woman International Master (WIM), becoming the youngest one in the world at the time. In 2015, at 15, she became the youngest ever to win the chess championship of Puerto Rico; Vázquez finished first scoring 8/9 points, a full point ahead of the runner-up, International Master Alejandro Montalvo. She won the bronze medal in the Girls U18 division of the World Youth Chess Championships in 2017. In November of the same year, Vázquez won the Women's Zonal 2.3 Championship on tie-break from Maritza Arribas Robaina and Yerisbel Miranda Llanes. As a result, Vázquez qualified to play in the Women's World Chess Championship.

Danitza Vázquez has played for the Puerto Rican team in the Chess Olympiad and the Women's Chess Olympiad.

References

External links
 
 
 

2000 births
Living people
Chess Woman International Masters
Chess Olympiad competitors
Puerto Rican chess players
People from Caguas, Puerto Rico